The Garcia Brothers is the seventh studio album by American hip hop duo Axe Murder Boyz. It was released on March 25, 2014 under their own label Canonize Productions in conjunction with Psychopathic Records. This would be their second and final release with Psychopathic, as they would depart the label for a second time in 2017 and sign with Majik Ninja Entertainment

Background
After Body In A Hole EP was released AMB began working on their new album The Garcia Brothers in 2011. For almost 2 years they worked on songs and scrapped them. They resigned with Psychopathic in early 2013, joining Insane Clown Posse, Moonshine Bandits and Kung Fu Vampire on The Mighty Death Pop! Tour. On the tour AMB announced that they have begun reworking on TGB and they finally have the baseline for what they wanted the album to sound like. During the 2013 GOTJ, Otis was asked when The Garcia Brothers would be released, and he was projecting a December 2013 release date. After a minor setback, The Garcia Brothers was released on March 25, 2014.

Style and influences
The style of The Garcia Brothers is very different from anything Axe Murder Boyz have done in recent years. Many reviewers of the album compared it to having a Tech N9ne/Strange Music type sound to it. The entire album was recorded at Psychopathic's own studio The Lotus Pod in Detroit, MI and produced by AMB member Otis.

Release
Psychopathic released snippets of TGB in late April/early May. The first music video from the album was "Might Go Mad" ft. Insane Clown Posse. Though the video does not show AMB & ICP it is the first video by Psychopathic to do that and have the lyrics in its place. "I Keeps It Movin'" was the second music video from the album. In a December 2014 interview with DesertJuggalos.com Otis/Young Wicked announced that another music video was to be shot. He later revealed that the music video will be for the song "Bleed" featuring Anybody Killa.

On March 25, 2015 Psychopathic Records announced that "The Garcia Brothers" album is now being sold at Best Buy stores.

Singles
The first single was "Might Go Mad" featuring Insane Clown Posse and was accompanied by a music video released in mid 2014.

The second single was "I Keeps It Movin" and was accompanied by a music video released in late 2014.

In a December 2014 interview with DesertJuggalos.com Otis/Young Wicked announced that the third single would be "Bleed" featuring Anybody Killa and was accompanied by a music video.

During AMB's 2015 GOTJ seminar, it was said that the music video for "Bleed" featuring Anybody Killa would be released in 2015.

Track listing

Personnel
Otis – vocals, production
Bonez Dubb – vocals
Insane Clown Posse (Violent J & Shaggy 2 Dope) – guest verse on "Might Go Mad"
Anybody Killa – guest verse on "Bleed"
Big Hoodoo – guest verse on "Listen"

Charts

References

2014 albums
Axe Murder Boyz albums
Psychopathic Records albums